Sylvia Pasquel (born Silvia Banquells Pinal, 13 October 1949) is a Mexican actress.

Career

1960s
At the age of nineteen, Pasquel did her first movie, El Despertar del Lobo (The Wolf's Awakening). That movie was made in 1968, the year in which Pasquel became very famous in Mexico. She followed her first film with her telenovela debut, in Los Inconformes (The Nonconformists).

In 1969, she took part in a movie about wrestling, starring alongside Santo and his wrestling enemy, Blue Demon, in Santo Contra Blue Demon en la Atlantida  (Santo versus Blue Demon in Atlantis). She also appeared in two other films in 1969, Una Mujer Honesta (An Honest Woman) and La Casa del Farol Rojo (The Redlight House).

1970s
The decade of the 1970s was a very busy one for Pasquel, as she starred in multiple films, soap operas, and even in magazine soaps, which were popular in Latin America then. In 1970, she starred in Me he de comer esa tuna (I Shall Eat That Prickly Pear), La Cruz de Mariza Cruzes (Mariza Cruzes' Cross) and in El Mariachi, the only telenovela she did that year.

In 1971, she played "Gianna Donatti" in the telenovela Muchacha Italiana Viene a Casarse (Italian Girl Comes to Get Married) with Angélica María. That soap opera was a major hit, and Pasquel followed her work there with another telenovela, La Recogida (The Step-Daughter). Her one movie in 1971 was Secreto de Confesion (Confession Secret). 1972 proved to be a relatively easy year for Pasquel, whose fame had already spread to the rest of Latin America and among Hispanics in the United States. She participated in only one movie and no soap operas. Her movie that year was named Cinco Mil Dolares de Recompensa (Five Thousand Dollars Reward).

She participated alongside Chabelo, a very popular children's actor of the era, in 1973's Chabelo y Pepito contra los Monstruos (Chabelo and Pepito Against the Monsters). This was followed by another telenovela, El Amor Tiene Cara de Mujer (Love has a Woman's Face). She finished 1973 playing "Maritza" in "Mi Rival" (My Rival).

Pasquel did two soap operas in 1974, each of which proved to be important in her career: in Ha LLegado una Intrusa (An Intruder has Arrived, remade during the 1990s as La Usurpadora), she played two roles in the same drama for the first time in her career, acting as twins "Veronina and Hilda Moreno". Mundo de Juguete (Toy World), meanwhile, became one of the most successful Mexican telenovelas of the era.

After El Milagro de Vivir (The Miracle of Living), a 1975 soap opera, Pasquel began slowing her on screen work rate, and she took 1976 off to return in 1977, with another soap opera, named Humillados y Ofendidos (Humiliated and Offended). Once again, she took a full year off the screens in 1978 and returned in 1979 with a movie named Johnny Chicano and a soap named J.J. Juez.

1980s
By the 1980s, Pasquel was already a family woman, a fact which contributed to a further slowdown of her screen career. She participated in 1980's Al Rojo Vivo (loosely translated to Very Red), in 1982's El Amor Nunca Muere (Love Never Dies), 1983's Cuando los Hijos se Van (When Children Leave), and 1987's Los Años Perdidos (The Lost Years).

She took off three more years after that, returning in 1990 to participate in one episode of the popular television show, Mujer, Casos de la Vida Real, which is hosted by her mother. The chapter she appeared in was based on a real-life story of a rape victim. Soon after, she made another telenovela, Dias sin Luna (Days Without a Moon). Her return to soap operas was followed by her return to film, with two movies made in 1991: Politico por Error (Politician by Mistake) and Asalto (Robbery).

1990s
In 1990, a teen-oriented soap opera, Alcanzar una estrella (Reaching a Star), with Eduardo Capetillo, had become a major hit on Mexican television. Pasquel acted in that production's 1991 sequel, Alcanzar una estrella II, where she acted alongside Capetillo, Sasha Sokol and a budding Puerto Rican star named Ricky Martin.

She followed that with 1993's Las Secretas Intenciones (Secret Intentions). and 1995's comedy film El Superman....Dilon Dos (The Super....lacy one, Part Two). In 1996, she participated in Para Toda la Vida (Forever), which was another telenovela. She returned once again in 1998's Huracan, where she played "Caridad".

2000s
She starred as "Zulema" in 2000's Mi Destino Eres Tu (You Are My Destiny).

In 2001, she participated in another major Mexican telenovela hit, El Manantial (The Cascade). That same year, she played as "Silvia" in Aventuras en el Tiempo (Time Adventures). During 2002, she participated in a very large number of episodes of Mujer, Casos de la Vida Real.

She also participated, in the Mexican soap opera Amarte es mi Pecado (My Sin is Loving You).

Her latest appearance was, in the soap opera Yo amo a Juan Querendón.

On stage, Pasquel had great success in 1979 in the play Claudia me quieren volver loco.

2010s
In 2013, Pasquel signed to star in Qué pobres tan ricos from the hit producer of Por Ella Soy Eva, Rosy Ocampo.

2020s
In 2022, Pasquel appeared on Netflix’s ’‘Siempre reinas’’(“Forever Queens”) to star in Qué pobres tan ricos from the hit producer of Por Ella Soy Eva, Rosy Ocampo.

Filmography

Films

Television

See also 
 Stephanie Salas
 Silvia Pinal
 Alejandra Guzmán
 Rocío Banquells

External links
 AlmaLatina.Net
 

1950 births
Living people
Pinal family
Mexican telenovela actresses
Mexican television actresses
Mexican film actresses
Mexican stage actresses
Actresses from Mexico City
20th-century Mexican actresses
21st-century Mexican actresses
Mexican people of Cuban descent
Mexican people of Catalan descent
People from Mexico City